Bolliger & Mabillard, officially Bolliger & Mabillard Consulting Engineers, Inc. and often abbreviated B&M, is a roller coaster design consultancy based in Monthey, Switzerland. The company was founded in 1988 by Walter Bolliger and Claude Mabillard, both of whom had worked for Giovanola.

B&M has pioneered several new ride technologies, most notably the inverted roller coaster and the box-section track. In 2016, the company completed its 100th roller coaster. B&M produces nine types of coaster models: Stand-Up Coaster, Inverted Coaster, Floorless Coaster, Flying Coaster, Hyper Coaster, Dive Coaster, Sitting Coaster, Wing Coaster and Family Coaster. Though B&M has not used the term, the company has also manufactured three giga coasters.

History

Roots 
Walter Bolliger and Claude Mabillard started working for Giovanola, a manufacturing company who supplied rides to Intamin, in the 1970s. During their time at Giovanola, they helped design the company's first stand-up roller coaster, Shockwave (at Six Flags Magic Mountain). They also worked on other projects, such as Z-Force (at Six Flags Great America). Bolliger & Mabillard left Giovanola, but the company continued to use their track design; the company's roller coasters Goliath (at Six Flags Magic Mountain) and Titan (at Six Flags Over Texas), use a track style very similar to B&M's.

Launch 
In 1987, Giovanola underwent a change of management, and B&M decided to leave and create their own company. At the time, B&M employed four people, including two draftsmen: Bolliger and Mabillard. When B&M was created, the pair had agreed not to make any more amusement attractions. However, Robert Mampe, Six Flags Great America's staff engineer, had worked with both men during the construction of Z-Force; he contacted the newly-formed company and asked them to reconfigure the cars for their Giovanola-built, Intamin bobsled coaster, to be relocated from Six Flags Great Adventure.

Following that project, Mampe asked the new company to design and build a stand-up roller coaster for Six Flags Great America, similar to Shockwave at Six Flags Magic Mountain. B&M accepted the offer and hired two more draftsmen. But B&M had a problem regarding how and where to manufacture the track pieces for the roller coaster. With the favorable history of the work done by Clermont Steel Fabricators (on Vortex, Kings Island, and Shockwave, Six Flags Great America), Walter Bolliger went to the steel plant and asked if they would be interested in manufacturing the track. Clermont Steel Fabricators accepted, and to this day, manufactures all of B&M’s roller coaster track pieces for all of North America. Now with a company to manufacture the track, B&M built its first roller coaster, a stand-up roller coaster, Iron Wolf, which opened in 1990 at Six Flags Great America. Two years later, Bolliger & Mabillard built another project for Six Flags Great America, Batman: The Ride, the world's first inverted roller coaster, which brought them to prominence in the industry.

Development 
Bolliger & Mabillard also invented the Floorless Coaster and the Dive Coaster. The company also built its first launched roller coaster, the Incredible Hulk, which is at Islands of Adventure. In 2010, B&M unveiled its new Wing Coaster and premiered the prototype model, named Raptor, at Gardaland in 2011. It has two seats on each side on the car that hang riders over the sides of the track.  there are fifteen in operation. In 2015, B&M constructed Thunderbird at Holiday World & Splashin' Safari, its first in-house launched coaster.

By 2010, B&M employed twelve engineers, twelve draftsmen and two draftswomen. The company has made other contributions to the roller coaster industry. The company built the trains for the Psyclone, a now-demolished wooden roller coaster at Six Flags Magic Mountain. The trains were later used on the park's Colossus wooden roller coaster (until it was refurbished by Rocky Mountain Construction), but were only used during October each year. The trains faced backward and usually raced against trains on the second track, which ran forward.

In 2013, the company launched the construction of Banshee, the world's longest inverted roller coaster. B&M supplied new trains for Steel Dragon 2000, built by D. H. Morgan Manufacturing in 2000. As of 2012, Bolliger & Mabillard had 85 operating roller coasters worldwide. Of these, twenty-two were listed among that year's Amusement Today Golden Ticket Awards Top 50 Steel Coasters List for 2012 and five were in the top 10.

By 2016, Bolliger & Mabillard had completed their 100th coaster, and had built more roller coasters than any other manufacturer on the Golden Ticket Awards Steel Coasters list.

Features

Bolliger & Mabillard currently manufactures nine different roller coaster styles: Stand-Up Coaster, Inverted Coaster, Floorless Coaster, Flying Coaster, Hyper Coaster, Dive Coaster, Sitting Coaster, Wing Coaster and Family Coaster. Bolliger & Mabillard has been involved in developing new technologies and concepts in roller coasters almost since its inception. It has often worked with engineer Werner Stengel and with designers and management of client theme parks.

Lift hills

Early Bolliger & Mabillard coasters feature an element known as a "pre-drop", a short drop after the top of the lift hill and before the start of the first drop, designed to reduce stress on the lift chain. The flat section between the pre-drop and the first drop serves as a shelf to support the weight of the train, reducing related stresses on the chain. On most coasters without a pre-drop, the weight of the train tends to pull on the lift chain as it begins its descent because the latter half of the train is still being lifted by the chain. Pre-drops have not been used on the company's Dive or Flying coasters, or on hyper coasters built after 1999. OzIris at Parc Astérix was the first B&M inverted roller coaster that does not feature a pre-drop. Ever since, no coaster built by B&M has featured a pre-drop because the chain accelerates to acquire the same speed as the train when it is being taken over by gravity after it passes the crest .

Trains
Most of Bolliger & Mabillard's roller coaster trains use four-abreast seating. Each car has one row of four seats, while the train length can vary between coasters. All of the company's coaster models, except the Dive Coaster and Wing Coaster use this configuration. The Dive Coaster uses six, seven, eight or ten-abreast seating, with two or three rows of seats. For example, Griffon at Busch Gardens Williamsburg, uses ten seats in three rows, while Krake at Heide Park uses six-across seating in three rows. On recent hyper coaster projects, B&M has used a new car design that has two rows of two seats; the two seats in the rear of the car pushed out from the centerline so that the four seats resemble a V formation. This formation has only been used on Behemoth at Canada's Wonderland, Diamondback at Kings Island, Intimidator and Shambhala: Expedición al Himalaya at PortAventura Park, in the resort PortAventura World. In 2013, B&M introduced a new car design that has two rows of two seats, however, they are not in a V formation.

All B&M hyper coasters use a type of restraint called a "T-bar" or "Clamshell" restraint, which consists of bar with a cushioned lap bar with two handles for riders to hold on to. This type of restraint generally does not use a seat belt, however seat belts have been added to Behemoth and Leviathan at Canada's Wonderland, Diamondback and Orion at Kings Island, and Intimidator and Fury 325 at Carowinds. Bolliger & Mabillard also uses over-the-shoulder restraints, in that the restraint is placed over the riders' shoulders and sits and extends to the riders' laps. This type of restraint is used on Dive, Inverted, Sitting, Flying, Floorless, Stand-up and Wing Coasters. Bolliger & Mabillard has recently begun using a vest like over the shoulder restraint, which reduces headbanging found on the older, more common padded over the shoulder restraints. These have been met with some criticism from the coaster community, due to the nature in which they tighten during the ride; stapling riders to their seats, resulting in less airtime (negative g-forces) being felt.

Track
A notable feature of Bolliger & Mabillard roller coasters is the box-section track. The running rails are connected to a box-section spine, instead of the circular spine used by other manufacturers. When a train travels around a box-section track, it creates a one-of-a-kind whooshing sound, which is sometimes nicknamed the “B&M roar” by roller coaster enthusiasts. However, on some Bolliger & Mabillard roller coasters, such as Talon at Dorney Park & Wildwater Kingdom and GateKeeper at Cedar Point, the track is filled with a proprietary sound dampening material to reduce this noise.

Also, depending on the model of the roller coaster, the track size can vary. Models such as the Flying, Wing and Dive Coaster have heavier trains which require a larger track size while models with lighter trains, such as the Stand-Up and Hyper Coaster, do not and use a smaller sized track.

Brakes
As of 2016, Bolliger & Mabillard uses three types of braking systems: friction, magnetic, and water.

Friction brakes
When B&M was first founded, the linear magnetic eddy brake had yet to be developed, so it used friction brakes as its main braking system. On the train, pads are fitted on the vehicle chassis between the wheel assemblies. On the brakes, similar pads are connected to steel supports. When the pads on the train come into contact with the brakes, friction is created which slows the train. Beginning with Kumba in 1993, friction brakes have also been used as trim brakes that regulate the speed of the train while it is still navigating the course.

Magnetic brakes
Magnetic brakes provide smoother deceleration than friction brakes; most B&M roller coasters built after 2003 have at least one set of magnetic brakes. Magnetic brakes do not make contact with the train. Metal fins that run parallel to the train are fitted on the vehicle chassis between the wheel assemblies. As the fins pass through the brakes, the magnetic field created by the brakes slows the train. Magnetic brakes have also been used as an alternate type of trim brake on B&M roller coasters such as Leviathan at Canada's Wonderland.

Water brakes
Water brakes were first introduced on SheiKra at Busch Gardens Tampa Bay in 2005. Water brakes can only be used when a splashdown element, in which a body of water surrounds a section of track, is present within the layout of the roller coaster. When scoops on the last car of each train come in contact with the surrounding water, the train slows down and the water is sprayed several feet into the air behind it.

List of roller coasters

In North America, B&M coaster designs have been manufactured by Ohio company Clermont Steel Fabricators since 1990.
As of 2022, Bolliger & Mabillard has built 124 roller coasters around the world. Some have either been relocated, renamed or closed.

References

External links 

Listing of B&M rides at the Roller Coaster DataBase

 
Roller coaster manufacturers
Design companies of Switzerland
Design companies established in 1988
Manufacturing companies established in 1988
1988 establishments in Switzerland